This is a list of Zob Ahan F.C.'s results at the 2010–11 Persian Gulf Cup, 2010–11 Hazfi Cup and ACL 2010.

Current squad 

 (vice-captain)

Iran Pro League

Matches 

Last updated May 20, 2011

League standings

Hazfi Cup

Last updated January 25, 2011

2010 AFC Champions League

Quarter-finals

Semi-finals

Final

Statistics

Goalscorers 
4 Goals
  Mohammad Reza Khalatbari
  Igor Castro

2 Goals
  Mohammad Ghazi

1 Goal
  Seyed Mohammad Hosseini
  Esmaeil Farhadi
  Mehdi Rajabzadeh
  Ghasem Hadadifar

Assists 
3 Assistants
  Hassan Ashjari

1 Assistant
  Farshid Talebi
  Ghasem Hadadifar
  Mohammad Ghazi

Cards

2011 AFC Champions League

Group stage

Round of 16

References

External links
Iran Premier League Statistics
Persian League
Soccerway

2010-11
Iranian football clubs 2010–11 season